Thomas H. Cook (born September 19, 1947) is an American author, whose 1996 novel The Chatham School Affair received an Edgar award from the Mystery Writers of America.

Biography
Thomas H. Cook was born in Fort Payne, Alabama, and holds a bachelor's degree from Georgia State College, a master's degree in American history from Hunter College, and a Master of Philosophy degree from Columbia University.

From 1978 to 1981, Cook taught English and History at Dekalb Community College in Georgia, and served as book review editor for Atlanta magazine from 1978 to 1982, when he took up writing full-time.

Cook began his first novel, Blood Innocents, while he was still in graduate school. It was published in 1980, and he has published steadily since then. A film version of one of his books, Evidence of Blood, was released in 1997.

Six of his novels have been nominated for awards, including Red Leaves in 2006, which was also shortlisted for the Crime Writers' Association's Duncan Lawrie Dagger and the Anthony Award, and went on to win the Barry Award and the Martin Beck Award.

Cook lives with his family in Cape Cod and New York City and Los Angeles.

Bibliography
Blood Innocents (Playboy, 1980) 
The Orchids (Houghton Mifflin, 1982). 
Tabernacle (Houghton Mifflin, 1983). 
Elena (Houghton Mifflin, 1986). 
Sacrificial Ground (Putnam, 1988). 
Flesh and Blood (Putnam, 1989). 
Streets of Fire (Putnam, 1989). 
Early Graves (Dutton, 1990). 
Night Secrets (Putnam, 1990). 
The City When It Rains (Putnam, 1991). 
Evidence of Blood (Putnam, 1991). 
Blood Echoes (Dutton, 1992). 
Mortal Memory (Putnam, 1993). 
Breakheart Hill (Bantam, 1995). 
The Chatham School Affair (Bantam, 1996). 
Instruments of Night (Bantam, 1998). 
Places in the Dark (Bantam, 2000). 
The Interrogation (Bantam, 2002). 
Taken: A Novelization (Dell, 2002). 
Moon Over Manhattan, with Larry King, (New Millennium Press, 2003). 
Peril (Bantam, 2004). 
Into the Web (Bantam, 2004). 
Red Leaves (Harcourt, 2005). 
The Murmur of Stones (Quercus, 2006)(published in the US as The Cloud of Unknowing, Harcourt, 2007). 
Master of the Delta (Harcourt, 2008). 
The Best American Crime Reporting 2008, (with Jonathan Kellerman and Otto Penzler), (Harper Perennial, 2008). 
The Fate of Katherine Carr (2009). 
The Last Talk with Lola Faye (Houghton Mifflin Harcourt, 2010). 
The Quest for Anna Klein (Houghton Mifflin Harcourt, 2011). 
The Crime of Julian Wells (Mysterious Press, 2012). 
Sandrine's Case (Mysterious Press, 2013). 
Fatherhood and Other Stories (Pegasus Press, 2013). 
A Dancer in the Dust (Grove/Atlantic/Mysterious, 2015), 
Even Darkness Sings (Pegasus Press, 2018).

References

1947 births
Living people
Hunter College alumni
Columbia University alumni
Savannah State University alumni
American mystery writers
20th-century American novelists
Novelists from Alabama
People from Fort Payne, Alabama
Edgar Award winners
Barry Award winners
21st-century American novelists
American male novelists
20th-century American male writers
21st-century American male writers